Theunis Christoffel Lötter  (born 8 June 1973) is a South African former rugby union player.

Playing career
Lötter matriculated at Framesby High School in Port Elizabeth and represented  at the annual Craven Week tournament in 1991. After school he enrolled at the University of Stellenbosch and represented the Maties and was selected for the  under-20 team in 1993 and 1994.

Lötter toured with the South Africa 'A' team to Britain and Ireland in 1996. After his playing career he started coaching and he was the head coach of the Paarl Gimnasium's first team, and the University of Stellenbosch's junior team during the Varsity Rugby.

References

1973 births
Living people
South African rugby union players
Griquas (rugby union) players
Boland Cavaliers players
Western Province (rugby union) players
Rugby union scrum-halves
Rugby union players from Port Elizabeth